Kifayat Gasimova (born February 1, 1986, in Kalbajar, Azerbaijan) is an Azerbaijani judoka.  She competes in the women's -57 kg category (lightweight).  She has won bronze at world and European level, and a silver medal at the 2006 European Judo Championships.  At the 2012 Summer Olympics, she lost to eventual champion, Kaori Matsumoto.

References

External links

 
 
 

1986 births
Living people
Azerbaijani female judoka
Judoka at the 2012 Summer Olympics
Olympic judoka of Azerbaijan
European Games competitors for Azerbaijan
Judoka at the 2015 European Games
Islamic Solidarity Games medalists in judo
Islamic Solidarity Games competitors for Azerbaijan
20th-century Azerbaijani women
21st-century Azerbaijani women